Defense intelligence or defence intelligence refers to military intelligence.

Defence Intelligence may also refer to:
Defence Intelligence, key member of the United Kingdom Intelligence Community  
Defence Intelligence (company), Canadian firm also known as Defintel
Defence Intelligence Organisation, Australian government agency

See also
Defence Intelligence Agency (disambiguation)
Naval Intelligence Division (disambiguation)